The 1998 MAC Championship Game was the second conference championship game of the Mid-American Conference, and was played on December 4, 1998, at Marshall Stadium, now known as Joan C. Edwards Stadium, in Huntington, West Virginia. The game featured a rematch of the 1997 game, between the East Division's Marshall Thundering Herd, and the West Division's Toledo Rockets. Marshall was heavily favored to win the game. Marshall defeated Toledo to claim their second consecutive conference title by a score of 23–17. During the game, Marshall starting quarterback Chad Pennington was hurt, and was replaced by Byron Leftwich.

References

Championship Game
MAC Championship Game
Marshall Thundering Herd football games
Toledo Rockets football games
December 1998 sports events in the United States
MAC Championship Game